Buljarica is a village in the municipality of Budva, Montenegro.

Geography
Buljarica has development potential to rival that of famed Velika Plaža of the south Montenegrin coast. Buljarican fields and the slopes of Dubovica hill are well suited for the development of tourism, and could potentially hold a city of Budva's size. Buljarica cove stretches from Resovo brdo cove to Dubovica, and has the largest beach of the otherwise limited beach areas of the Budva Riviera.

Demographics
According to the 2011 census, its population was 205.

See also
Gradište Monastery

References

Populated places in Budva Municipality
Beaches of Montenegro